The Reichstadt agreement was an agreement made between Austria-Hungary and Russia in July 1876, who were at that time in an alliance with each other and Germany in the League of the Three Emperors, or Dreikaiserbund. Present were the Russian and Austro-Hungarian emperors together with their foreign ministers, Prince Gorchakov of Russia and Count Andrassy of Austria-Hungary. The closed meeting took place on July 8 in the Bohemian city of Reichstadt (now Zákupy). They agreed on a common approach to the solution of the Eastern question, due to the unrest in the Ottoman Empire and the interests of the two major powers in the Balkans. They discussed the likely Russo-Turkish War of 1877–1878, its possible outcomes and what should happen under each scenario.

The later Budapest Convention of 1877 confirmed the main points, but when the war concluded with the Treaty of San Stefano in 1878, the terms of the treaty were quite different leading to Austrian insistence on convening a revision at the Congress of Berlin later that year. These events laid the background for the subsequent Bulgarian Crisis of 1885-1888, and ultimately World War I.

Format 
The negotiations took place in a private and almost informal setting. It is significant that the results of the meeting were not written down, so that the Austrian and Russian view of what was agreed on differed significantly. There was neither a signed formal convention nor even a signed protocol. The minutes were dictated separately by both Andrassy and by Gorchakov suggesting that neither side really trusted the other side. The extent of agreed Austrian annexation in Bosnia and Herzegovina has remained controversial. It was these inconsistencies that necessitated further discussions at the Constantinople Conference and the subsequent Budapest Convention, though these largely confirmed or amended the Reichstadt discussions.

Terms of the agreement 
The Balkan Christians would gain a measure of independence.

Austria would allow Russia to make gains in Bessarabia and the Caucasus.

Russia would allow Austria to gain Bosnia.

Russia and Austria agree not to create a big Slavic state in the Balkans.

Implications 
This effectively meant that Austria was assuring Russia that to stay out of a war between Russia and the Ottoman Empire. It also meant that the Austrians and the Russians were agreeing on how the Balkans would be split up in the case of a Russian victory.

See also 
 History of Austria
 Bulgarian Crisis (1885–1888)

References

Bibliography 
 Crampton, R. J. A Concise History of Bulgaria. Cambridge University Press 1997
 Beller, Steven. A Concise History of Austria. Cambridge University Press 2007 

History of the Balkans
1876 treaties
1876 in the Russian Empire
1876 in Austria-Hungary
Treaties of Austria-Hungary
Treaties of the Russian Empire
Austria-Hungary–Russia relations
Bilateral treaties of Russia